Tomasz Kiełbowicz (born 21 February 1976 in Hrubieszów) is a retired Polish footballer (midfielder or full-back), who played for Unia Hrubieszów, Siarka Tarnobrzeg, Raków Częstochowa, Widzew Łódź, Polonia Warsaw and Legia Warsaw.

Successes

 4 x Polish Champion (2000, 2002, 2006 and 2013)
 4 x Polish Cup Winner (2001, 2007/08, 2010/11 and 2011/12)
 2 x Ekstraklasa Cup (2001 and 2008)
 2 x Polish SuperCup Winner (2000 and 2002)

Career

He joined Legia from Polonia Warsaw.

Kiełbowicz has made nine appearances for the Poland national football team.

References

External links
 
 

Living people
1976 births
People from Hrubieszów
Polish footballers
Siarka Tarnobrzeg players
Raków Częstochowa players
Widzew Łódź players
Polonia Warsaw players
Legia Warsaw players
Ekstraklasa players
Sportspeople from Lublin Voivodeship
Association football midfielders
Association football defenders
Poland international footballers